Richard Alexander Schell (born March 10, 1950) is a senior United States district judge of the United States District Court for the Eastern District of Texas.

Education and career

Born in Dallas, Texas, Schell received a Bachelor of Arts degree from Southern Methodist University in 1972 and a Juris Doctor from the Dedman School of Law at Southern Methodist University in 1975. He was an instructor at the Dedman School of Law from 1975 to 1976. He was an assistant district attorney of Collin County, Texas in 1976. He was in private practice in McKinney, Texas from 1977 to 1982. He was a Judge of the County Court at Law in Collin County from 1982 to 1986. He was a Judge of the 219th Judicial District Court of Texas from 1986 to 1988.

Federal judicial service

On April 13, 1988, Schell was nominated by President Ronald Reagan to a seat on the United States District Court for the Eastern District of Texas vacated by Judge William Steger. Schell was confirmed by the United States Senate on May 27, 1988, and received his commission on June 6, 1988. He served as Chief Judge from 1994 to 2001. He took senior status on March 10, 2015.

References

Sources
 

1950 births
Living people
Judges of the United States District Court for the Eastern District of Texas
People from Dallas
Southern Methodist University alumni
Dedman School of Law alumni
Southern Methodist University faculty
Texas state court judges
United States district court judges appointed by Ronald Reagan
20th-century American judges
21st-century American judges